Åke Claesson (2 July 1889 – 29 May 1967) was a Swedish film actor. He appeared in more than 60 films between 1925 and 1962.

Selected filmography

 Två konungar (1925) - Carl Michael Bellman
 Ulla, My Ulla (1930) - Carl Michael Bellman
 The Bjorck Family (1940) - Karl (uncredited)
 A Crime (1940) - Dr. Forenius
 Life Goes On (1941) - Librarian (uncredited)
 The Ghost Reporter (1941) - Opera Director Fridell (uncredited)
 Dunungen (1941) - Borgström
 Vårat gäng (1942) - Lindgren (uncredited)
 En sjöman i frack (1942) - Captain
 Flames in the Dark (1942) - Dr. Lundvall (uncredited)
 The Case of Ingegerd Bremssen (1942) - Procecutor (uncredited)
 Sun Over Klara (1942) - Carl Michael Bellman
 Adventurer (1942) - Dr. Schonæus
 General von Döbeln (1942) - Prästen
 Ta hand om Ulla (1942) - Dr. Hjalmar Brander (uncredited)
 Ungdom i bojor (1942) - Senior Lecturer
 Nothing Is Forgotten (1942) - Professor Torin (uncredited)
 The Heavenly Play (1942) - Profet Jeremiah
 Kvinnan tar befälet (1942) - Hospital doctor (uncredited)
 Imprisoned Women (1943) - Doctor (uncredited)
 She Thought It Was Him (1943) - Publisher
 Young Blood (1943) - Lars-Erik Hermansson
 Hans majestäts rival (1943) - Carl Michael Bellman
 Gentleman with a Briefcase (1943) - Recording Clerk
 Aktören (1943) - Prästen
 Kungajakt (1944) - Commissioner
 Appassionata (1944) - Prison Director Nils Holmqvist (uncredited)
 Släkten är bäst (1944) - Dr. Hasselman
 I Am Fire and Air (1944) - Ahrman, Jenny's Father
 Vändkorset (1944) - Fredrik Klipping
 Maria of Kvarngarden (1945) - Judge
 Flickor i hamn (1945) - Chairman
 Black Roses (1945) - Christian Lind, gardener
 Jagad (1945) - Dr. Nordenson (uncredited)
 I som här inträden... (1945) - Dr. Karling
 The Serious Game (1945) - Roslin
 Tired Theodore (1945) - The President
 The Journey Away (1945) - Doctor Löfberg
 Ödemarksprästen (1946) - Carl von Linne
 Desire (1946) - Doctor
 Iris and the Lieutenant (1946) - Oscar Motander
 Hotell Kåkbrinken (1946) - Pontus Hallman
 Onda ögon (1947) - Doctor
 Maria (1947) - Gus Pettersson
 The Night Watchman's Wife (1947) - Baron
 Neglected by His Wife (1947) - Chief Editor
 Music in Darkness (1948) - Augustin Schröder
 Sunshine (1948) - Jörgen Bure
 Eva (1948) - Fredriksson
 Two Stories Up (1950) - Chief Physician
 Ung och kär (1950) - Foreign affairs advisor
 Miss Julie (1951) - Doctor
 Sköna Helena (1951) - Marcellus
 The Road to Klockrike (1953) - Waterhead's Father
 Seger i mörker (1954) - Professor Wijkander
 Young Summer (1954) - Christian Carlström
 Karin Månsdotter (1954) - Svante Sture
 Gabrielle (1954) - Malmrot
 People of the Finnish Forests (1955) - Doctor Remberg
 Paradise (1955) - Doctor Martin
 Night Child (1956) - Judge
 My Passionate Longing (1956) - Nina's Father
 Do You Believe in Angels? (1961) - Torsten Waller

References

External links

1889 births
1967 deaths
Swedish male film actors
Male actors from Stockholm
20th-century Swedish male actors